Sabeen Rizvi is a Pakistani politician who served as member of the National Assembly of Pakistan.

Political career
She was elected to the National Assembly of Pakistan as a candidate of Pakistan Muslim League (N) on a seat reserved for women from Punjab in the 2008 Pakistani general election. She resigned from her National Assembly seat in 2012.

References

Living people
Pakistani MNAs 2008–2013
Year of birth missing (living people)